Dillenburg station is a through station in the town of Dillenburg in the German state of Hesse. Immediately adjacent to the station is the central bus station, which is served by many bus lines connecting to the surrounding countryside. Together they form the public transport node of Dillenburg.

Train services

The following services currently call at Dillenburg:
Main-Sieg-Express (RE 99) Siegen - Dillenburg - Gießen - Friedberg - Frankfurt (Main)
Mittelhessen-Express (RB 40) Dillenburg - Gießen - Friedberg - Frankfurt (Main)

Services

Passengers 
Dillenburg station has five platform tracks and is served by Regional-Express services, the Mittelhessen-Express, Regionalbahn services and a pair of EuroCity trains on the Siegen–Klagenfurt route. With occasional exceptions, trains run regularly from platforms, as follows:

Freight 
The station is divided into two parts: the passenger station and the adjacent freight yard to its south. Here, regional freight traffic from Haiger and Dillenburg stations is consolidated and linked to the national transport network via the Wetzlar and Kreuztal freight yards. Dillenburg freight yard is also of great importance for the supply of the local ThyssenKrupp Nirosta steel mill with steel coils, delivered every day except Thursday in a single train from the Ruhr area (especially Bochum).

History 
Until the cessation of passenger service on the Schelde Valley Railway between Dillenburg and Wallau (Lahn) and the Dietzhölz Valley Railway between Dillenburg and Ewersbach, the station had another platform with tracks 9 and 10, from which trains departed for these two branch lines. Access to this platform is no longer possible.

In the past there had been some long-distances trains via Dillenburg. There was the Interregio line between Frankfurt and Münster and once a day the train continued from Münster to Norddeich Mole.

Local connections 
The bus station is next to the railway station, which is served by all local and regional bus lines. There is a taxi stand and short-term parking next to the station. Further south there is long stay parking.

References

Railway stations in Hesse
Buildings and structures in Lahn-Dill-Kreis